Curve of the Earth may refer to:

 Curve of the Earth (album), a 2016 album by Mystery Jets
 The Curve of the Earth, a 2007 album by Attack in Black
 Figure of the Earth, the shape of the planet